Oscar Louis Ringle (April 12, 1878 – November 4, 1945) was an American politician and lawyer.

Born in Wausau, Wisconsin, Ringle received his bachelor's degree from the University of Wisconsin–Madison and his law degree from the University of Wisconsin Law School. He then practiced law in Wausau, Wisconsin. In 1913, Ringle served in the Wisconsin State Assembly as a member of the Democratic Party. Then in 1933 and 1934, Ringle was elected District Attorney of Marathon County, Wisconsin. Ringle was appointed postmaster of Wausau, Wisconsin in 1937. His grandfather, Bartholomew Ringle and father, John Ringle, had previously served in the Wisconsin legislature.

Notes

1878 births
1945 deaths
Politicians from Wausau, Wisconsin
American people of German descent
University of Wisconsin–Madison alumni
University of Wisconsin Law School alumni
Wisconsin lawyers
Democratic Party members of the Wisconsin State Assembly